is a Japanese folklorist born in 1939 at Okayama Prefecture.

Writings
 Folktales of Okayama, in English translation (英訳・岡山の民話 Eiyaku - Okayama no Minwa)
 A Collection of Grimm Old Tales (グリム昔話集 Gurimu Mukashibanashi-shuu)
 Scottish Folktales (スコットランドの民話 Sukottorando no Minwa)
 Irish Folktales and Legends (アイルランドの民話と伝説 Airurando no Miwa to Densetsu)
 Tristram and Iseult (トリスタンとイズート Torisutan to Izuuto)

References

Living people
1939 births
Japanese writers